Their Spirits Circle the Earth, also known as Challenger Memorial, is an outdoor memorial and sculpture commemorating victims of the Space Shuttle Challenger disaster by Jim Mason, installed in Columbus, Ohio's Battelle Riverfront Park, in the United States.

Description and history
The artwork features a brass ball with a  diameter on a granite slab, measuring approximately 3 ft. 6 in. x 1 ft. 1.5 in. x 3 ft. 6 in. The sculpture rests on a concrete base measuring approximately 4 in. x 1 ft. 4 in. x 4 ft. 2 in. An inscription on one side reads: 

The memorial was surveyed by the Smithsonian Institution's "Save Outdoor Sculpture!" program in 1992.

See also
 1987 in art

References

1987 establishments in Ohio
1987 sculptures
Brass sculptures
Downtown Columbus, Ohio
Granite sculptures in Ohio
Monuments and memorials in Ohio
Monuments and memorials to explorers
Outdoor sculptures in Columbus, Ohio
Space Shuttle Challenger disaster